The 2022 Tirreno–Adriatico was a road cycling stage race that took between 7 and 13 March 2022 in Italy. It was the 57th edition of Tirreno–Adriatico and the fifth race of the 2022 UCI World Tour.

Teams 
All 18 UCI WorldTeams and six UCI ProTeams made up the 24 teams that participated in the race. , with six riders, was the only team to not enter a full squad of seven riders.

A wave of flu-like symptoms, although with no positive COVID-19 test results, resulted in an unusually high attrition rate as many riders were forced to withdraw from the race. Of the 167 riders who started the race, 143 finished.

UCI WorldTeams

 
 
 
 
 
 
 
 
 
 
 
 
 
 
 
 
 
 

UCI ProTeams

Route

Stages

Stage 1 
7 March 2022 — Lido di Camaiore,  (ITT)

Stage 2 
8 March 2022 — Camaiore to Sovicille,

Stage 3 
9 March 2022 — Murlo to Terni,

Stage 4 
10 March 2022 — Cascata delle Marmore to Bellante,

Stage 5 
11 March 2022 — Sefro to Fermo,

Stage 6 
12 March 2022 — Apecchio to Carpegna,

Stage 7 
13 March 2022 — San Benedetto del Tronto to San Benedetto del Tronto,

Classification leadership table 

 On stage 2, Tadej Pogačar, who was third in the points classification, wore the violet jersey, because first-placed Filippo Ganna wore the blue jersey as the leader of the general classification and second-placed Remco Evenepoel wore the white jersey as the leader of the young rider classification.
 On stage 3, Tim Merlier, who was second in the points classification, wore the violet jersey, because first-placed Filippo Ganna wore the blue jersey as the leader of the general classification.
 On stage 5, Tim Merlier, who was second in the points classification, wore the violet jersey, because first-placed Tadej Pogačar wore the blue jersey as the leader of the general classification. For the same reason, Remco Evenepoel, who was second in the young rider classification, wore the white jersey.
 On stage 6, Remco Evenepoel, who was second in the points classification, wore the violet jersey, because first-placed Tadej Pogačar wore the blue jersey as the leader of the general classification. Pogačar and Evenepoel were also first and second in the young rider classification, so third-placed Thymen Arensman wore the white jersey.
 On stage 7, Jonas Vingegaard, who was second in the points classification, wore the violet jersey, because first-placed Tadej Pogačar wore the blue jersey as the leader of the general classification. For the same reason, Thymen Arensman, who was second in the young rider classification, wore the white jersey.

Final classification standings

General classification

Points classification

Mountains classification

Young rider classification

Team classification

References

External links 
 

2022
2022 UCI World Tour
2022 in Italian sport
March 2022 sports events in Italy